Winterbach is a municipality in the district of Rems-Murr in Baden-Württemberg in Germany.

Sons and daughters of the town
 Werner Dilger (1942–2007), professor of computer science, Professor of Artificial Intelligence at the TU Chemnitz
 Ingo J. Biermann (born 1978), director, filmmaker and producer, grew up In Winterbach from 1981 to 2000

Personalities who have worked locally
 Giovane Élber (born 1972), former Brazil national football team, lived in Winterbach in the 1990s, when he played for VfB Stuttgart
 Davie Selke, (* 1990), footballer, grew up in Winterbach

References

Rems-Murr-Kreis